Constitutional Assembly elections were held on 28–30 December 1944. The United Front of Arevalist Parties won 50 of the 65 seats.

References

Elections in Guatemala
Guatemala
1944 in Guatemala
Election and referendum articles with incomplete results